Major General Sharon K.G. (Kim Greiman) Dunbar is a retired United States Air Force general officer.  She was the first female in Air Force history to serve as Commanding General of the Air Force District of Washington (AFDW), the Air Force component to the Joint Force Headquarters National Capital Region, and Commander of the 320th Air Expeditionary Wing, both headquartered at Joint Base Andrews, Maryland.  In this unique dual-command position, Dunbar oversaw Air Force operations in the National Capital Region with specific responsibilities for organizing, training and equipping combat forces for aerospace expeditionary operations as well as for continuity of government associated with homeland security response, disaster relief, civil support operations, and national special security events.  She was likewise the senior Air Force officer responsible for the execution of major ceremonial events such as the 57th Presidential Inauguration in 2013.  As the AFDW Commander, Dunbar provided major command-level support for 60,000 military and civilian personnel assigned worldwide and was the Uniform Code of Military Justice authority for 40,000 Airmen.

Military career 
The highest ranking Air Force officer of Korean descent, Dunbar was commissioned in 1982 upon graduation from the U.S. Air Force Academy and graduated with distinction from the National War College in Washington, D.C. Her military career encompassed a series of procurement, manpower, political-military, and command positions. As a Major, she was chosen to be the Air Force's first congressional fellow and was assigned to serve in the U.S. Senate for Senator Dan Coats (R-IN), Chairman of the Air/Land Forces and Personnel Subcommittees on the Senate Armed Services Committee and a respected bi-partisan voice on defense and acquisition reform. Coats assigned Dunbar to author the pivotal legislative initiative in 1996 known as the Quadrennial Defense Review (QDR). She then served as the military assistant to the Honorable Rudy de Leon and went on to command a mission support squadron, Air Force Basic Military Training, and the 75th Air Base Wing at Hill Air Force Base, Utah where she also served as the first female installation commander. In addition to these military assignments, Dunbar was appointed by the Secretary of Defense to serve on two separate congressionally-mandated Task Forces convened to address sexual assault and harassment in the military services and their respective military service academies. She was later appointed by the Secretary of the Air Force to direct the Air Force Follow-On Review in response to the 2009 Fort Hood shooting as well as to lead the Air Force's repeal of Don't Ask, Don't Tell in 2011.

Personal life 
Dunbar and her brother were born in the Chicago area and raised in the twin cities of Bloomington-Normal, Illinois by American parents who were immigrants from Korea (mother) and Germany (father). Immediately upon graduating from high school, her brother attended the United States Military Academy at West Point and she was accepted into the third class of females to attend the United States Air Force Academy in Colorado Springs. Dunbar and her husband met during their first year at the Air Force Academy and married shortly after their graduation. They have two children. Dunbar retired from the Air Force after 32 years of service on December 1, 2014 and currently works for General Dynamics. She serves on the Board of Directors for the Girl Scout Council of the Nation's Capital, Armed Services YMCA and Be The Change, Inc. She was a Global Ambassador with Vital Voices, is a Trustee with Union Institute and University, and was appointed by the Secretary of Defense in 2016 to serve on DACOWITS. Dunbar completed her doctoral studies in Public Policy at The George Washington University and received an honorary doctorate from Union Institute and University.

Education

1982 Bachelor of Science degree in engineering and management, U.S. Air Force Academy, Colorado Springs, Colorado
1984 Master's degree in business administration, California State University, Long Beach, California
1985 Squadron Officer School, Maxwell Air Force Base, Alabama
1993 Kellogg National Fellowship Program, W.K. Kellogg Foundation, Battle Creek, Michigan
1994 Air Command and Staff College
1996 Legislative Fellowship Program, Brookings Institution, D.C.
1998 Advanced Program Managers Course, Defense Systems Management College, Fort Belvoir, Virginia 
1999 Seminar XXI Foreign Politics, International Relations and the National Interest, Massachusetts Institute of Technology, Cambridge, Massachusetts
2000 Master's degree in national security studies, Distinguished Graduate, National War College, Fort Lesley J. McNair, D.C. 
2005 Senior Executive Fellows Program, Harvard University, Cambridge, Massachusetts
2009 Challenges in Global Leadership, Judge Business School, University of Cambridge, England
2009 Program for Senior Managers in Government, Harvard University, Cambridge, Massachusetts

Military awards and aecorations

 Air Force Distinguished Service Medal with oak leaf cluster
Defense Superior Service Medal 
Legion of Merit with two oak leaf clusters 
Meritorious Service Medal with four oak leaf clusters 
Air Force Commendation Medal 
Joint Meritorious Unit Award with oak leaf cluster 
Air Force Outstanding Unit Award with two oak leaf clusters 
Air Force Organizational Excellence Award with oak leaf cluster 
Air Force Recognition Ribbon 
National Defense Service Medal with bronze star 
Global War on Terrorism Service Medal

See also
 List of female United States military generals and flag officers

References

Place of birth missing (living people)
Year of birth missing (living people)
Living people
American military personnel of Korean descent
American people of German descent
Trachtenberg School of Public Policy & Public Administration alumni
Female generals of the United States Air Force
National War College alumni
National Defense University alumni
Recipients of the Defense Superior Service Medal
Recipients of the Legion of Merit
United States Air Force Academy alumni

American people of South Korean descent